Lego Mindstorms (sometimes stylized as LEGO MINDSTORMS) is a hardware and software structure which develops programmable robots based on Lego building blocks. Each version includes computer Lego bricks, a set of modular sensors and motors, and parts from the Lego Technic line to create the mechanical systems. The system is controlled by the Lego bricks.

While originally conceptualized and launched as a tool to support educational constructivism, Mindstorms has become the first home robotics kit available to a wide audience. It has developed a community of adult hobbyists and hackers following the product's launch in 1998. In October 2022, The Lego Group announced Lego Mindstorms will be discontinued at the end of 2022.

Pre-Mindstorms

Background

In 1985, Seymour Papert, Mitchel Resnick and Stephen Ocko created a company called Microworlds with the intent of developing a construction kit that could be animated by computers for educational purposes. Papert had previously created the Logo programming language as a tool to "support the development of new ways of thinking and learning", and employed "Turtle" robots to physically act out the programs in the real world. As the types of programs created were limited by the shape of the Turtle, the idea came up to make a construction kit that could use Logo commands to animate a creation of the learner's own design. Similar to the "floor turtle" robots used to demonstrate Logo commands in the real world, a construction system that ran Logo commands would also demonstrate them in the real world, but allowing the child to construct their own creations benefitted the learning experience by putting them in control  In considering which construction system to partner with, they wanted a "low floor high ceiling" approach, something that was easy to pick up but very powerful. To this end, they decided to use Lego bricks due to the system and diversity of pieces, and the Logo language due to the groups familiarity with the software and its ease of use. Lego was receptive to collaboration, particularly because its educational division had founding goals very similar to those of the Microworlds company. The collaboration very quickly moved to the newly minted MIT Media lab, where there was an open sharing of ideas. As a sponsor of the entire lab, Lego was allowed royalty free rights to mass-produce any technology produced by Papert, Resnick and Ocko's group; and was also allowed to send an employee over to assist with research, so they sent engineer Alan Tofte (also spelled Toft) who helped with the design of the programmable brick. As another part of the MIT Media Lab was community outreach, so the bricks would be used working with children in schools for both research and educational purposes.

Lego/Logo, lego tc Logo (1985)

The first experiments of combining Lego and the Logo programming language was called Lego/Logo and it started in 1985. Similar to the "floor turtles" used to demonstrate Logo commands in the real world, Lego/Logo used Logo commands to animate Lego creations. It is important that children could build their own machines to program, as they would then care more about their projects and be more willing to explore the mathematical concepts involved in making them move. The Lego/Logo system allowed children to create their own designs and experiments, offered multiple paths for learning and encouraged a sense of community. First, machines are built out Lego. The machines are then connected to a computer and programmed in a modified version of Logo. The Lego/Logo system introduced new types of parts for making creations such as: motors, sensors and lights. The motors and sensors are connected to an interface box which is communicates with a computer. Lego/Logo would later be commercialized by the Lego group Lego tc Logo. It was observed that using the Lego/Logo system, children developed a form of knowledge about the physical world that allowed those even without mathematics or verbal skills to solve problems effectively using the system.

Logo Brick 1st Generation, "Grey Brick" (1986)

While Lego/Logo was powerful, it was restricted somewhat by the requirement to have the creations attached to a computer. The group began working on further iterations of the Lego/Logo environment to produce a robot that could interact not only with the environment but with other robots programmed in the same system.
The experiments with an untethered brick (called the Logo Brick or "Grey Brick") began in the fall of 1986. To speed up the design process, the Logo Brick contained the processor chip from an Apple II computer. It ran an adapted version of Lego/Logo written for the Apple II computer. The Lego/Logo interface box, The previous development of the group, had only two sensor ports available, which the design team observed were not always enough. To address this, they gave the Logo Brick four sensor ports. The Logo Brick was made out of a modified Lego battery box and was about the size of a deck of cards. The Logo Brick was tested in schools.

Lego Mindstorms and RCX (1996)

Development
While Lego had been interested in mass-producing the programmable brick concept for a while, they had to wait until enough people owned personal computers and the components required to produce the intelligent brick went down in price. Development of what would later be known as Lego Mindstorms started in 1996 as the first product of the newly created home-learning division of Lego Education (Lego Dacta). The product's name of "Mindstorms" was intended to express the user experience of the product, it is named after Papert's book Mindstorms, as the user experience was similar to the educational constructivism concepts described in his book. The Lego home education team used the insights that MIT researchers discovered from testing the 3rd Generation Logo Brick ("Red Brick") in schools as the basis for the development of the mass-produced programmable brick. The physical programmable brick was re-engineered from the ground up, as the experimental programmable bricks were not designed for robustness or cost-effective manufacturing. The programming language of the product was developed with help from members of the MIT Media lab. Lego decided to use a Visual programming language for Mindstorms, inspired by the LOGOBlocks language previously used with programmable brick experiments, in order to make the product accessible to children who might be unfamiliar with programming. While the technology that Mindstorms was based on was aimed towards "all children", the chosen target demographic of Lego Mindstorms was intentionally narrow, in order to garner positive press by outselling expectations. The decision was made to aim the product towards 10 to 14-year-old boys, partly because it was Lego's main target demographic, and partly based on market research (not substantiated by the findings of the MIT Media Lab) which concluded that this demographic would be most attracted to computerized toys. This choice of target demographic directly informed the color of the RCX brick (which was made yellow and black to resemble construction equipment) and the sample uses for the Mindstorms kit (such as making autonomous robots).

The project's at-first low profile allowed the Mindstorms team the freedom to develop the product using operating procedures then-unorthodox to the Lego Group. Unlike traditional Lego sets, the Mindstorms Robotics Invention System did not have a main model, nor was the play driven by storytelling.  To bridge the gap between this new play experience and pre-existing Lego ones, the Mindstorms team created a lot of opportunities for people interested in the product to engage with each other, such as the creation of Mindstorms.com, Mindstorms Discovery Centers, and the FIRST Lego League. The creation of these experiences was done through partnerships with a relatively large amount of external groups that the Mindstorms team interacted with as equal partners, something that was uncommon for the Lego group at the time. To ease tensions between Mindstorms and more conventional products, the project team was given autonomy from Lego's product development process and instead reported directly to the company's senior management.

Promotion of the Lego Mindstorms Robotics Invention System began 6 months before the product was planned to launch. The product was first soft launched with the opening of the Mindstorms Discovery Center at the Museum of Science and Industry, where children could interact with the Mindstorms Robotics Invention System to complete set tasks, getting them familiar with the product. The Mindstorms product was launched concurrently with Lego Cybermaster, another Lego product spun off from the MIT programmable brick technology that was more in line with the traditional product philosophies of the Lego group.

Instead of being sold at toy stores, the product was sold at electronics stores like BestBuy and CompUSA, due to the relatively high cost of the set.

Launch
Lego Mindstorms was released on 1 September 1998 at a retail price of $199. The entire production run (of between 60 and 100 thousand units) sold out within 3 months. Despite being aimed towards children, the kit quickly found an audience with adults and hackers of all ages; Lego company surveys had determined that seventy percent of Lego Mindstorms Hobbyists were adults. Shortly following the product's launch, hobbyists began sharing reverse-engineered versions of the RCX brick's Microcode and Firmware on the internet, leading to the development of alternative programming languages for the RCX such as "Not Quite C" (NQC) and alternative operating systems for the brick like legOS. The Lego Group was surprised by the products embrace by adult hobbyists, and was not sure how to respond to the sharing of proprietary code. The Mindstorms team would determine that the embrace of the product by the hacking community proved that the product was worth developing; In order to foster this burgeoning community, an official forum was established on the Lego website and a "right to hack" clause was added to end user license agreement of the Lego Mindstorms software.

Robotics Discovery Set and Droid, Dark Side Developer Kit
The Robotics Discovery Set was a more affordable and simpler package than the Robotics Invention Set. Instead of being based on the RCX, it had its own programmable brick called the Scout. An even simpler version of the Scout would be featured in two Star-Wars-themed Mindstorm sets.

Scout
Lego also released a blue computer called the Scout, which has 2 sensor ports, 2 motor ports (plus one extra if linked with a Micro Scout using a fiber optic cable), and a built-in light sensor, but no PC interface. It comes with the Robotics Discovery Set. The Scout can be programmed from a collection of built-in program combinations. In order to program the Scout, a user must enable "power mode" on it. The Scout can store one program.

The Scout is based on a Toshiba microcontroller with 32 KB of ROM and 1 KB of RAM, where about 400 bytes are available for user programs. Due to the extremely limited amount of RAM, many predefined subroutines were provided in ROM. The Scout only supports passive external sensors, which means that only touch, temperature and other unpowered sensors can be used. The analog-to-digital converters used in the Scout only have a resolution of 8 bits, in contrast to the 10-bit converters of the RCX.

There was a plan for Lego to create a booster set that allows programming the Scout from a computer with software such as RCX code. However, due to the complexity of this project, it was abandoned.

The RCX can control the Scout brick using the "Send IR Message" program block. The RCX does all of the controlling, and therefore can be programmed with the PC, while the Scout accepts commands. The Scout brick must have all of its options set to "off" during this process.

Micro Scout
The Micro Scout was added as an entry-level to Lego robotics. It is a very limited Pbrick with a single built-in light sensor and a single built-in motor. It has seven built-in programs and can be controlled by a Scout, Spybotics or RCX unit using VLL. Like the Scout, the Micro Scout is also based on a microcontroller from Toshiba.

The unit was sold as part of the Droid Developer Kit (featuring R2-D2) and later the Dark Side Developer Kit (featuring an AT-AT Imperial Walker).

Robotics Invention System
The main core of the first generation of Mindstorms sets were the Robotics Invention System sets. These were based around the RCX (Robotic Command eXplorers) brick and the 9 V Lego Technic peripherals available at the time. It also includes three touch-sensors and an optical sensor, using the technology from the earlier 9 V sensors from the pre-Mindstorms sets.

RCX
 
The RCX is based on the 8-bit Renesas H8/300 microcontroller, including 32 KB of ROM for low-level IO functions, along with 32 KB of RAM to store high-level firmware and user programs. The RCX is programmed by uploading a program using a dedicated infrared interface. After the user uploads a program, the RCX can run it on its own without the need for computer access. Programs may make use of three sensor input ports and three 9 V output ports, in addition to the IR interface, enabling several RCX bricks to communicate. A built-in LCD can display the battery level, the status of the input/output ports, which program is selected or running, and other information.

Version 1.0 RCX bricks feature a power adapter jack in addition to batteries. In version 2.0 (as well as later 1.0s included in the RIS 1.5), the power adapter jack was removed. Power adapter-equipped RCX bricks were popular for stationary robotics projects (such as robot arms) or for controlling Lego model trains. In the latter context, the RCX might be programmed with Digital Command Control (DCC) software to operate multiple wired trains.

The IR interface on the RCX is able to communicate with Spybots, Scout Bricks, Lego Trains, and the NXT (using a third-party infrared link sensor). The RCX 1.0 IR receiver carrier frequency is 38.5 kHz, while the RCX 2.0 IR carrier frequency is 76 kHz. Both versions can transmit on either frequency. The RCX communicates with a computer using a Serial or USB IR tower. As the RCX is discontinued, support for the interface is limited on more recent operating systems than Windows XP.

All RCX versions have a unique number printed on them, which could be registered on the now-defunct Lego Mindstorms RCX website. This was necessary to obtain technical support. The first RCX produced is marked "000001," and was on display at the Mindstorms 10th Anniversary event.

The Lego RCX was available in new sets from 1998 (Lego Set 9719: Robotics Invention System 1.0) through 2003 (Lego Set 9786: Robo Technology Set, with USB cable). The original RCX 1.0 worked with existing Lego power supply products from the Lego Train theme, Lego Product 70931: Electric Train Speed Regulator 9V Power Adaptor for 120v 60 Hz - US version (Years: 1991 thru 2004), Lego Product 70938: Electric Train Speed Regulator 9V Power Adaptor for 230v 50 Hz - European version (Years: 1991 thru 1996). Both of these products converted wall power to 12VAC, through a coaxial power connector (also called a "barrel connector"), 5.5 mm outside, 2.1 mm inside. These were sometimes sold alone and sometimes available as part of other sets such as Lego Set 4563: Load N' Haul Railroad (Year: 1991) and Lego Set 10132: Motorized Hogwarts Express (Year: 2004).

Lego Mindstorms NXT

Lego Mindstorms NXT was a programmable robotics kit released by Lego in August 2006, replacing the first-generation Lego Mindstorms kit.
The kit consists of 577 pieces, including: 3 servo motors, 4 sensors (ultrasonic, sound, touch, and light), 7 connection cables, a USB interface cable, and the NXT Intelligent Brick. The Intelligent Brick is the "brain" of a Mindstorms machine. It lets the robot autonomously perform different operations. The kit also includes NXT-G, a graphical programming environment that enables the creation and downloading of programs to the NXT. The software also has instructions for 4 robots: Alpha-Rex (a humanoid), Tri-Bot (a car), Robo-Arm T-56 (a robotic arm), and Spike (a scorpion)

Lego Mindstorms NXT 2.0

The Lego Mindstorms NXT 2.0 was launched on 5 August 2009. It contains 619 pieces (includes sensors and motors), two Touch Sensors, an Ultrasonic Sensor, and introduced a new Color Sensor. The NXT 2.0 uses Floating Point operations whereas earlier versions use Integer operation. The kit costs around US$280.

Lego Mindstorms EV3

The Lego Mindstorms EV3 is the third generation Lego Mindstorms product. EV3 is a further development of the NXT. The system was released on 1 September 2013. The Lego Mindstorms EV3 set includes motors (2 large servo motor and 1 medium servo motor), sensors (2 touch sensors, ultrasonic sensor, color sensor, infrared sensor, and the new gyro sensor), the EV3 programmable brick, 550+ Lego Technic elements and a remote control (the Infrared Beacon, which is only on Home/Retail mode). The EV3 can be controlled by smart-devices. It can boot an alternative operating system from a microSD card, which makes it possible to run ev3dev, a Debian-based operating system.

Lego Education Spike Prime

Spike Prime was announced in April 2019. While not being part of the Mindstorms product line, the basic set includes three motors (1 large 2 medium) and sensors for distance, force and color a controller brick based on an STM32F413 microcontroller and 520+ Lego Technic elements.

Lego Mindstorms Robot Inventor
Lego Mindstorms Robot Inventor was announced in June 2020 and released later in autumn. It has four medium motors from Spike Prime, two sensors (distance sensor and color/light sensor) also from Spike Prime, a Spike Prime hub with a six-axis gyroscope, an accelerometer, and support for controllers and phone control. It also has 902+ Lego Technic elements.

Programming languages

Use in education 
Mindstorms kits are also sold and used as an educational tool, originally through a partnership between Lego and the MIT Media Laboratory. The educational version of the products is called Mindstorms for Schools or Mindstorms Education, and later versions come with the ROBOLAB GUI-based programming software, developed at Tufts University using the National Instruments LabVIEW as an engine.

See also
 FIRST Lego League
 World Robot Olympiad (WRO)
 Robofest
 FIRST Tech Challenge
 RoboCup Junior
Lego Education (WeDo 2.0)
 Big Trak
 iRobot Create
 Robotis Bioloid
 The Robotic Workshop
 Robotics suite
 C-STEM Studio
 Botball

References

Further reading
 Bagnall, Brian. Maximum Lego NXT: Building Robots with Java Brains. Variant Press. 2007. .
 Bagnall, Brian. Core Lego Mindstorms. Prentice-Hall PTR. 2002. .
 Baum, Dave. Definitive Guide to Lego Mindstorms, 2nd ed. Apress. 2002. .
 Erwin, Benjamin. Creative Projects with Lego Mindstorms (book and CD-ROM). Addison-Wesley. 2001. .
 Ferrari et al. Building Robots with Lego Mindstorms: The Ultimate Tool for Mindstorms Maniacs. Syngress. 2001. .
 Gindling, J., A. Ioannidou, J. Loh, O. Lokkebo, and A. Repenning., "Legosheets: A Rule-Based Programming, Simulation and Manipulation Environment for the Lego Programmable Brick", Proceeding of Visual Languages, Darmstadt, Germany, IEEE Computer Society Press, 1995, pp. 172–179.
 Breña Moral, Juan Antonio. Develop LeJOS programs Step by Step.

External links

 
 

 
1998 in robotics
Educational toys
Electronic toys
Embedded systems
Products introduced in 1998
Robot kits
Products and services discontinued in 2022